A. Thomas Schomberg is a sculptor who resides in Colorado. Schomberg grew up in America's mid-west during the 1940s and 1950s. After studying for a short time in Europe and completing both MA and MFA degrees, Schomberg moved to the east coast to teach at a progressive community college. Although he received tenure, in 1975 he relocated to Colorado where he established Schomberg Studios with his wife, Cynthia, who is also his agent.

Background

In 1981, Sylvester Stallone commissioned Schomberg to create a bronze statue of Rocky Balboa. Three 2-ton, 10-foot copies were cast. One was installed atop the steps of the Philadelphia Museum of Art for the filming of Rocky III.

His daughter Robin manages the Rocky Statue reproduction line.

References

External links

20th-century American sculptors
Living people
Year of birth missing (living people)
21st-century American sculptors